Elachista triatomea is a moth of the family Elachistidae found in Europe.

Description
Head white. Forewings white, with some scattered fuscous scales, especially posteriorly; plical and second discal stigmata black, distinct. Hindwings in male grey, in female grey-whitish.

Adults are on wing from June to July.

The larvae mine the blades of various grasses of Festuca species, including sheep's fescue (Festuca ovina),  red fescue (Festuca rubra) and fine-leaf sheep fescue (Festuca tenuifolia).

Distribution
It is found in Ireland, Great Britain, Fennoscandia, Denmark, Germany, Austria, the Czech Republic, Hungary and Romania.

References

triatomea
Leaf miners
Moths described in 1828
Moths of Europe
Taxa named by Adrian Hardy Haworth